Carlton Davis III (born December 31, 1996) is an American football cornerback for the Tampa Bay Buccaneers of the National Football League (NFL). He played college football at Auburn and was drafted by the Buccaneers in the second round of the 2018 NFL Draft.

Early years
Davis attended Miami Norland Senior High School in Miami Gardens, Florida, where he played high school football. He originally committed to Ohio State University to play college football but changed his commitment to Auburn University.

College career
Davis was a starter as a true freshman at Auburn in 2015. He finished the season with 56 tackles and three interceptions. As a sophomore in 2016, he recorded 46 tackles. Davis finished the 2017 season with 36 tackles, 12 pass deflections, and one interception. On January 3, 2018, Davis declared his intentions to enter the 2018 NFL Draft.

Professional career
Davis attended the NFL Scouting Combine in Indianapolis and completed the majority of drills, but opted to skip the short shuttle and three-cone drill. Davis finished eighth among all cornerbacks in the broad jump and bench press. On March 9, 2018, Davis participated at Auburn's pro day and performed the majority of drills, but elected to skip the bench press, vertical jump, and broad jump. Davis also improved his times in the 40-yard dash (4.44s), 20-yard dash (2.60s), and 10-yard dash (1.59s). At the conclusion of the pre-draft process, Davis was projected to a second round pick by NFL draft experts and scouts. He was ranked as the sixth best cornerback prospect in the draft by Sports Illustrated, was ranked the eighth best cornerback by DraftScout.com, and was ranked as the ninth best cornerback in the draft by Scouts Inc.

The Tampa Bay Buccaneers selected Davis in the second round with the 63rd overall pick in the 2018 NFL Draft. Davis was the ninth cornerback drafted in 2018.

On May 24, 2018, the Tampa Bay Buccaneers signed Davis to a four-year, $4.39 million contract that includes $2.43 million guaranteed and a signing bonus of $1.27 million.

Tampa Bay Buccaneers

2018 season
Davis made his professional debut in Week 1 during a 48–40 win against the New Orleans Saints in which he had four tackles. In Week 2, during a 27–21 win against the Philadelphia Eagles, Davis recorded six tackles, a pass deflection, and his first career fumble recovery via a strip-sack by teammate Kwon Alexander on Nick Foles. In Week 16, during a 27–20 loss to the Dallas Cowboys, Davis recorded two tackles and his first career forced fumble.

Davis finished his rookie season with 40 tackles, four pass deflections, one forced fumble, and one fumble recovery.

2019 season
In Week 1, during a 31–17 loss to the San Francisco 49ers, Davis recorded tackles and his second career fumble recovery. In Week 2, during a 20–14 win against the Carolina Panthers, Davis recorded seven tackles and two pass deflections. In Week 4, during a 55–40 win against the Los Angeles Rams, Davis recorded eight tackles. In Week 12, during a 35–22 win against the Atlanta Falcons, Davis recorded five tackles, five pass deflections, and his first career interception on Matt Ryan.

Davis finished his second professional season with 60 tackles, 19 pass deflections, one forced fumble, one fumble recovery, and one interception.

2020 season
On April 8, 2020, Davis announced that he would be changing his jersey number from 33 to 24 in honor of the late Kobe Bryant.

In Week 1 against the New Orleans Saints, Davis, guarding the 2019 NFL Offensive Player of the Year and First-team All-Pro, Michael Thomas, Davis was targeted 19 times, only allowing two catches and no touchdowns. Later that year, Davis contributed to holding Thomas to zero catches in the Divisional Round Game of the NFL Playoffs in New Orleans on January 17, 2021,

In Week 2 against the Carolina Panthers, Davis recorded his first interception of the season off a pass thrown by Teddy Bridgewater during the 31–17 win.
In Week 4 against the Los Angeles Chargers, Davis recorded an interception off a pass thrown by Justin Herbert late in the fourth quarter to secure a 38–31 Bucs’ win.
In the following week's game against the Chicago Bears, on Thursday Night Football, Davis recorded another interception, this time off a pass thrown by Nick Foles, during the 20–19 loss. Overall, Davis finished the 2020 season with  68 total tackles, four interceptions, and 18 passes defended in 14 games. Davis played in all four games in the Buccaneers' playoff run that resulted in the team winning Super Bowl LV.

2021 season
Davis entered the 2021 season as a starting cornerback for the Buccaneers. He suffered a quad injury in Week 4 and was placed on injured reserve on October 7, 2021. He was activated on December 3.

2022 season
Davis re-signed with the Buccaneers on a three-year, $45 million contract on March 16, 2022. Davis recorded his first interception of the season against the Bengals in a 34-23 loss.

Controversies
On April 4, 2021, Davis went on Twitter and tweeted an offensive Asian slur. When informed it meant an offensive term for Asian people, he proceeded to cite a section of the Urban Dictionary which states its use as also meaning lame in South Florida slang. It wasn't until the following day that he tweeted an apology and vowed not to use the term again.

NFL career statistics

References

External links
Tampa Bay Buccaneers bio
Auburn Tigers bio

1996 births
Living people
Miami Norland Senior High School alumni
Players of American football from Miami
American football cornerbacks
Auburn Tigers football players
Tampa Bay Buccaneers players